The FBI Victims Identification Project (also known as VICTIMS) is an active research project within the FBI Laboratory to create a national database containing all available records of unidentified human remains. The goal of VICTIMS 
is to create a federally sponsored national database of unidentified remains. Currently there are many groups attempting to bring closure to an estimated 40,000 unidentified human remains cases in the United States, but VICTIMS is the first attempt to produce a comprehensive approach to the problem.

Current status 
Currently in the data gathering stage, VICTIMS will contain a variety of forms of information that may assist in the identification of unidentified human remains. This information includes case data, biological data, photographs, facial reconstructions, anthropological data, radiographs and dental charts. The project is requesting United States agencies with unidentified human remains to contact them to enter their cases into the database.

Project team 
The VICTIMS project team consists of the FBI Laboratory personnel, personnel from the FBI Visiting Scientist Program administered by Oak Ridge Institute for Science and Education and the prime contractor Guiding Beacon Solutions. Guiding Beacon, a management and technology consulting firm from Pennsylvania, is providing the technology and data collection efforts for the project.

See also 
 FBI
 List of people who disappeared mysteriously

References

External links

Federal Bureau of Investigation
Missing people organizations